László Vadász (January 27, 1948 in Kiskunfélegyháza – January 3, 2005) was a Hungarian chess player who held the FIDE title of Grandmaster (GM). He was one of the strongest Hungarian players in the 1970s. 
His last Elo number was 2271, but he was considered inactive as he did not play any Elo-rated game after the 2000/01 Hungarian Championship. Vadász reached his highest Elo number in 2505 in January 1978.

References

External links 
 

1948 births
2005 deaths
Hungarian chess players
Chess grandmasters
People from Kiskunfélegyháza
20th-century chess players
20th-century Hungarian people